Li Kwok-ying MH (Chinese: 李國英, born 18 November 1949 in  Tai Po, New Territories, Hong Kong with family root in Baoan, Guangdong) was a member of the Legislative Council of Hong Kong representing New Territories East and a member of Tai Po District Council for Tai Po Hui. He is a Punti of New Territories. He is a solicitor and a member of Democratic Alliance for the Betterment and Progress of Hong Kong.

Li attended John Moore University in England and married with two children. His wife is the cousin of Andrew Cheng Kar Foo.

References

 Democratic Alliance for the Betterment and Progress of Hong Kong

1949 births
Living people
L
L
L
HK LegCo Members 2004–2008
Members of the Election Committee of Hong Kong, 2012–2017